Kayhan Özer (born 11 June 1998) is a Turkish athlete. He competed in the men's 4 × 100 metres relay event at the 2020 Summer Olympics.

References

External links
 

1998 births
Living people
Turkish male sprinters
Athletes (track and field) at the 2020 Summer Olympics
Olympic athletes of Turkey
Place of birth missing (living people)
Athletes (track and field) at the 2022 Mediterranean Games
Mediterranean Games silver medalists for Turkey
Mediterranean Games medalists in athletics
21st-century Turkish people